The Ballantine  Tournament was a professional golf tournament played at the Wentworth Club in England. The event was played twice, in 1960 and 1961 and was sponsored by George Ballantine & Son Ltd, whisky proprietors.

The 1960 event was the first major tournament in Britain in which the use of the bigger ball was compulsory. The bigger ball was also used in 1961.

Winners

References

Golf tournaments in England
1960 establishments in England
1961 disestablishments in England